Odontophrynus carvalhoi (common nane: Carvalho's escuerzo) is a species of frog in the family Odontophrynidae.

Description
Males measure  and females  in snout–vent length. The snout is vertical in profile. The parotoid glands are large and elongated to elliptical in shape. Dorsal ground colour is greyish green. There is a blackish to greyish green Y-shaped mark that runs from each upper eyelid to near the
sacral region.

The male advertisement call is composed of a single, multi-pulsed note.

Habitat and conservation
Odontophrynus carvalhoiis found adjacent to deciduous or semi-deciduous forest areas in Caatinga, Atlantic Forest, and Cerrado biomes. It has been characterized as a dry forest border inhabitant of northeastern Brazil. It is a terrestrial frog usually found near water. It is common during the breeding time but otherwise difficult to find. Breeding is explosive, and the tadpoles develop in small intermittent streams and temporary ponds. It could be impacted by habitat loss caused by livestock grazing and fire.

References

carvalhoi
Endemic fauna of Brazil
Amphibians of Brazil
Taxa named by Jay M. Savage
Amphibians described in 1965
Taxonomy articles created by Polbot
Taxa named by José Miguel Alfredo María Cei